Roda de Fogo is a Brazilian telenovela produced and broadcast by TV Globo. It premiered on 25 August 1986 and ended on 20 March 1987, with a total of 179 episodes. It's the thirty sixth "novela das oito" to be aired on the timeslot. It is created by Lauro César Muniz and directed by Dennis Carvalho.

Cast

References

External links 
 

1986 telenovelas
Brazilian telenovelas
1986 Brazilian television series debuts
1987 Brazilian television series endings
TV Globo telenovelas
Portuguese-language telenovelas